Diploschema is a genus of beetles in the family Cerambycidae, containing the following species:

 Diploschema brunnea Martins & Monné, 1980
 Diploschema howdeni Martins & Monné, 1980
 Diploschema maculata Martins & Monné, 1980
 Diploschema mandibulare Fuchs, 1964
 Diploschema rotundicolle (Audinet-Serville, 1834)
 Diploschema weyrauchi Lane, 1966

References

Torneutini